Bahadurabad Ghat Railway Station is a defunct railway station located in Dewanganj Upazila, Jamalpur District, Bangladesh.

History 
The demand for jute was increasing all over the world. For the purpose of meeting that growing demand, there was a need for better communication system than the existing communication system to supply jute from Eastern Bengal to Port of Kolkata. Therefore in 1885 a 144 km wide meter gauge railway line named Dhaka State Railway was constructed to bring raw jute to Kolkata mainly by river which connects Mymensingh with Narayanganj. This railway was extended up to Jamalpur in 1894 and up to Jagannathganj in Sarishabari Upazila in 1899. In 1912, the railway line was extended from Jamalpur to Bahadurabad Ghat.

Rail ferry 
Bahadurabad Ghat was connected by rail ferry across Jamuna river to Tistamukh Ghat by Santahar–Kaunia line.

References

External link 
 

Jamalpur District
Railway stations in Bangladesh
Railway stations opened in 1912
1912 establishments in British India
Former railway stations in Bangladesh